Black May refers to a period (May 1943) in the Battle of the Atlantic campaign during World War II, when the German U-boat arm (U-Bootwaffe) suffered high casualties with fewer Allied ships sunk; it is considered a turning point in the Battle of the Atlantic.

Background
After February battles around convoys SC 118, ON 166, and UC 1, Black May was the culmination of the March-May 1943 crisis in the Battle of the Atlantic.

March
The U-boat offensive reached its peak in March, with a series of major convoy battles, first around convoys HX 228, SC 121, and UGS 6; then followed the battle for HX 229/SC 122, the largest convoy battle of the war.

The German U-boat arm (U-Bootwaffe) (UBW) lost 12 U-boats during this time.

A Royal Navy report later concluded that "The Germans never came so near to disrupting communications between the New World and the Old as in the first twenty days of March 1943."

April
Some respite for the Royal Navy came in April, as the UBW was unable to maintain such a large presence in the Atlantic. Many of the boats heavily involved in March had withdrawn for replenishing; nevertheless the boats still operational in the month remained active.

Allied losses in April were 64 ships totalling ; 39 ships were lost in the Atlantic. The UBW lost 15 boats from all causes.

However, in the following month, the strategic and tactical advantages swung to the Allies, where it remained for the rest of the campaign.

"Black May"
In May 1943, U-boat strength reached its peak, with 240 operational U-boats of which 118 were at sea, yet the sinking of Allied ships continued to decline. May 1943 also had the greatest losses suffered by U-boats up to that time, with 41 being destroyed in May 1943 — 25% of the operational U-boats. The month opened with the battle for ONS 5, a hard-fought clash which saw heavy losses on both sides: 13 merchant ships and six U-boats. But the tactical improvements of the escorts began to take effect; the next three convoys that were attacked resulted in just seven ships sunk and an equal number of U-boats. Finally, five U-boats were sunk attacking convoy SC 130, with Admiral Dönitz's son Peter among those lost aboard , while no convoy ships were lost. 

On 24 May 1943, Dönitz — shocked at the defeat suffered by the U-boats — ordered a temporary halt to the U-boat campaign; most were withdrawn from operational service. The U-boats were unable to return to the fray in significant numbers until autumn, and never regained the advantage.

During May there had been a drop in Allied losses, coupled with a tremendous rise in U-boat losses; 18 boats were lost in convoy battles in the Atlantic in the month, 14 were lost to air patrols; six of these in the Bay of Biscay. With losses in other theatres, accidents, or other causes, the total loss to the U-boat arm in May was 43 boats.

This month had the most losses suffered by the U-Boat Arm in the war so far, nearly three times the number of the previous highest, and more boats than had been lost in the whole of 1941. Equally significant was the loss of experienced crews, particularly the junior officers, who represented the next generation of commanders. Black May signalled a decline from which the U-boat arm never recovered; despite various efforts over the next two years, the U-boats were never able to re-establish the threat to Allied shipping they had previously posed.

Allied success
This change was the result of a combination of the sheer numbers of Allied ships at sea, Allied air power at sea, and technological developments in anti-submarine warfare. These had been introduced over the period and came to fruition in May, with devastating results.

Tactical and technical developments
The most important factor in the Allied success was that the escorts were getting better; escort groups were becoming more skilled, and scientific analysis was producing more efficient tactics. New weapons such as the Hedgehog, and FIDO, were coming into use, and new tactics, such as the creeping attack pioneered by Capt. "Johnnie" Walker, proved devastatingly effective. Support groups were organized, to be stationed at sea in order to reinforce convoys under attack, and to have the freedom to pursue U-boats to destruction, rather than just drive them away. The advantage conferred by Ultra, conversely, became less significant at this stage of the campaign. Its value previously had been to enable convoys to be re-routed away from trouble; now that the escorts could successfully repel or destroy attackers there was little reason to do so. While the Admiralty balked at using convoys as bait, out of regard for Merchant Navy morale, there was no advantage in avoiding U-boat attacks.

Air power
Over convoys, the introduction of "very long range" aircraft, such as the Liberator, and the use of additional escort carriers to close the air gap had a major effect in both repelling assaults and destroying U-boats. The re-introduction of air patrols over the Bay of Biscay by long range Beaufighters and Mosquitoes, to attack boats as they came and went from base, also began to take effect at this stage of the conflict. Operational analysis was used here, too, to improve the efficiency both of attack methods and the weapons in use.

Numbers
Numbers were a factor in Allied success, though the effect was more than sheer numbers alone; both the UBW and the Allies had many more vessels operational in 1943 than they had at the beginning of the war.

The Atlantic campaign was a tonnage war; the UBW needed to sink ships faster than they could be replaced to win, and needed to build more U-boats than were lost in order not to lose. Before May 1943, the UBW was not winning; even in their worst months, the majority of convoys arrived without being attacked, while even in those that were attacked, the majority of ships got through. In HX 229/SC 122, for example, nearly 80% of the ships arrived safely.
However, U-boat losses were also manageable; German shipyards were producing 20 U-boats per month, while losses for most months prior to Black May were less than half that. What changed in May was that the UBW started to lose; the loss of 43 U-boats (25% of the UBW operational strength) was a major blow, and losses outstripping production became commonplace, continuing till the end of the war.

German response
The Germans tried to turn the campaign in the Atlantic back in their favour by introducing tactical and technological changes. The first tactical change saw U-boats starting operations in new waters, such as the Indian Ocean, in the hope that their targets would be less defended. Although the U-boats found fewer escort ships, there were also fewer merchant ships to sink. The far-away U-boats were called the Monsun Gruppe.

Another tactical change was to try to counter Allied air power by fighting on the surface rather than diving. When  came under attack from an aircraft in March 1943, rather than diving, she stayed on the surface and shot down the attacking aircraft. It was hoped that this success could be repeated if U-boats were given better anti-aircraft defences.

To facilitate this several U-boats were converted to flak U-boats (such as ), but they proved unsuccessful. At first, the flak U-boats gave the Allies a shock but they soon welcomed attempts by U-boats to prolong their stay on the surface. Additional defences against aircraft was offset by the U-boat having to remain on the surface longer, increasing the chance of the submarine's pressure hull being punctured. The gunners' effectiveness was limited by the lack of protection from strafing aircraft, and Allied pilots often called in surface reinforcements to deal with flak U-boats. Furthermore, the extra anti-aircraft guns caused drag when the U-boat was submerged. The U-333 incident had proved to be the exception rather than the rule and the flak experiment was abandoned after six months; the best defence for U-boats against aircraft was to dive if attacked.

New technologies were also tried as a way to regain the upper hand. In mid-1943, two new technologies were introduced to the U-boats: the Wanze radar warning device and T5 Zaunkönig torpedoes. The Wanze warning device was designed to give U-boats advance warning of aircraft by detecting incoming radar waves so that the U-boats could dive before the aircraft started its attack run. The T5 Zaunkönig torpedoes were designed to zigzag in the hope that they would have a better chance of finding a target within a convoy. The Allies, in turn, introduced the Foxer noisemaking decoy in an attempt to defeat the acoustic homing device of the T5 torpedo. As a response, the Germans developed the T11 torpedo that was designed to ignore noisemaking decoys, but the war ended before it could be deployed.

The first U-boats fitted with snorkels (German: Schnorchel) went into service in August 1943. The snorkel was basically an extendable pipe that allowed U-boats to take in air without surfacing, allowing the U-boat's diesel engines to run submerged for longer periods. However, the snorkel suffered from technical problems and did not see wide use until mid-1944. Allied radar also became precise enough to pick up even the small target of the snorkel.

The UBW also developed a radically new submarine design, the Elektroboot (the Type XXI and Type XXIII boats). Elektrobootes did not need to surface at all during operations, however the first Elektrobootes were commissioned too late to see combat in the war.

None of the new tactics or technologies could turn the tide of war for the U-boat arm and heavy losses of U-boats continued. After May 1943, the rate of loss of U-boats was greater than the rate at which new U-boats were commissioned, and the number of operational U-boats slowly declined.

Notes

References
 Miller, David. U-Boats: the Illustrated History of the Raiders of the Deep. Washington: Brassey's Inc, 2000.
 Neistle, Axel: German U-Boat Losses during World War II (1998). 
 Roskill, Stephen : The War at Sea 1939–1945 Vol II (1956). ISBN (none)
 Stern, Robert C. U-Boats in action. Squadron/Signal pub., 1977.
 van der Vat, Dan:  The Atlantic Campaign (1988) 

Battle of the Atlantic
Naval battles and operations of World War II involving the United Kingdom
Naval battles of World War II involving Canada
Naval battles of World War II involving Germany
1943 in military history
May 1943 events